Georg Heinrich Weber (27 July 1752 Göttingen – 25 July 1828 Kiel) was a German botanist, physician and professor at the University of Kiel. He was also the father of Friedrich Weber, the German entomologist.

In botany, Weber was known for his work on lichens, algae, and bryophytes in addition to seed plants.

References

External links

1752 births
1828 deaths
18th-century German botanists
18th-century German physicians
19th-century German botanists
Scientists from Göttingen